The Blues Women's team (known as the nib Blues Women for sponsorship reasons) are a New Zealand women's professional rugby union team based in Auckland, New Zealand that competes in the Super Rugby Aupiki competition.

History

Historic clash 
The first women's Super Rugby clash between the Blues and Chiefs was announced in March 2021. The match was to be a one-off but both franchises said that it was the first step in their commitment to developing a Super Rugby team for women in the future. Eloise Blackwell was named as the Blues captain for the historic match with Willie Walker named as coach. On 29 April the Blues women's team was announced.

The teams played for the 'Waipuea Women's Rugby Taonga' trophy. The name was derived from the words Wai (for Waikato, Waitemata water, river and sea) and Puea (for winds that carry korero – a conversation or meeting – over land, mountains and sea). It was unveiled by the Blues Women's captain Eloise Blackwell and Blues captain Patrick Tuipulotu on the Sky Tower.

On 1 May 2021, the Blues and Chiefs women created history when they played in the first-ever women's Super Rugby match in New Zealand. The Blues hosted the Chiefs women at Eden Park in a double header before the Super Rugby Aotearoa Round 10 match between their men's teams. The Blues women were overwhelmed by the Chiefs 39–12 in the historic match.

Super Rugby Aupiki announced 
New Zealand Rugby announced on 6 October 2021, that an elite women's competition called Super Rugby Aupiki was confirmed for March 2022. The competition would run for four weeks and the women would be paid for their participation.

Inaugural squad and Coach named 
The Blues women released a list of player signings along with the other three teams in November 2021. Willie Walker was named as Head Coach, and his assistant coaches were Mel Bosman and James Semple.

Inaugural season 
The Blues Women's opening match was cancelled due to Hurricanes Poua forced withdrawal due to COVID cases and isolation requirements within their squad. The Blues and Hurricanes Poua shared the competition points with the match being called a draw. The Blues finally made their long-awaited Super Rugby Aupiki debut against Matatū, they ran in three tries in their 21–10 victory. The Blues final match was against the Chiefs Manawa, the two sides having last met in the historic clash the year before. The Blues were left scoreless as the Chiefs showed their dominance in the 35–0 outcome.

Current squad 
On 21 November 2022, the squad for the 2023 Super Rugby Aupiki season was announced. They also had the largest amount of growth with the signing of 12 rookies.

Current coaches and management 
Blues named their coaching group for the inaugural Super Rugby Aupiki.

 Head Coach: Willie Walker
 Assistant Coach: Melodie Bosman
 Assistant Coach: James Semple
 Manager: Dean Watkins
 Physio: Georgia Milne
 Campaign Coordinator: Stacey Addenbrooke

Captain

Coach 

Notes: Official Super Rugby Aupiki competition matches only, including finals.

References

External links 

 Official website

2021 establishments in New Zealand
Super Rugby Aupiki
New Zealand rugby union teams
Rugby clubs established in 2021
Sport in Auckland